Girl with a Suitcase is a 1961 Italian romantic drama film by Valerio Zurlini starring Claudia Cardinale as a spirited but naive young woman who lives on the fluctuating good will of others. It was entered into the 1961 Cannes Film Festival.

Plot
Aida leaves her boyfriend Piero, a musician, for Marcello, a wealthy young nobleman who promises great things and then dumps her at a garage with her suitcase. When she tracks him to the family mansion, he sends his sixteen-year-old brother, Lorenzo, out to get rid of her. Taking pity on the girl, he takes her with her suitcase to a pensione where she can spend the night.

He is meant to be studying by day, but sneaks away to spend time with Aida and slips presents and money to her. One evening he stays drinking and dancing with friends she has met, who depart at midnight leaving the two alone. When he creeps home at dawn, his hostile aunt spots him and his secret is out. Next time he is able to meet Aida she warns him that she has an illegitimate child who is currently away at a summer camp. When she agrees to meet Lorenzo later, the family priest appears instead and, after telling her that Lorenzo is the little brother of Marcello who seduced her, tells her to leave the boy alone and leave town.

She goes with her suitcase to the seaside resort where Piero is working, but he is furious at seeing her again and hits her. A brawny friend of his, Romolo, thinks he will take advantage of the unhappy girl and gets her drunk. When she rejects his advances, he offers her money. At that moment Lorenzo, who has tracked her down, appears and reclaims her. Unashamed at attacking a slight boy, Romolo starts beating him up until stopped by others. Taking him to the beach, Aida bathes his battered face and, alone together in the dusk, they are at last close. But Lorenzo has to catch a train home at two in the morning and, as they part at the station, he presses an envelope on her. Opening it when he has gone, she finds a parting gift of money. Once again, she has been left on her own.

Cast

References

External links

1961 films
Italian black-and-white films
1960s Italian-language films
1961 romantic drama films
Titanus films
Films directed by Valerio Zurlini
Films set in Emilia-Romagna
1960s Italian films